Dede (Dede) is a 2017 Georgian drama film directed by Mariam Khatchvani. It had an international premiere in the Karlovy Vary International Film Festival and screened in East Of West section where it won Special Mention prize. The film is an international co-production between Georgia, Croatia, the United Kingdom, Ireland, the Netherlands and Qatar.

Cast
George Babluani
Natia Vibliani
Girshel Chelidze
Nukri Khatchvani
Spartak Parjiani
Sofia Charkviani
Mose Khatchvani

Reception
On review aggregator website Rotten Tomatoes, the film has a 100% approval rating based on 6 reviews, with an average rating of 9/10.

Stephen Dalton of The Hollywood Reporter wrote: "Feminism meets fatalism in this starkly beautiful Georgian melodrama".

References

External links

2017 drama films
2010s Georgian-language films
Svan-language films
Drama films from Georgia (country)